Carex otaruensis is a tussock-forming species of perennial sedge in the family Cyperaceae. It is native to eastern parts of China and Japan.

See also
List of Carex species

References

otaruensis
Taxa named by Adrien René Franchet
Plants described in 1895
Flora of Japan
Flora of Anhui